Below is the list of ancient amphitheatres in Turkey.  

Amphitheaters
Ancient Roman buildings and structures in Turkey
Hellenistic architecture
Roman amphitheatres